Kyoto Prefectural Yamashiro Regional Museum (京都府立山城郷土資料館) is a regional museum located in Yamashiro District of Kizugawa City, Kyoto Prefecture.  Its collections and exhibits cover archeological ruins as well as historical artifacts from south Yamashiro district of Kyoto Prefecture.

Exhibition

Permanent Exhibition
Exhibits archeological ruins and historical artifacts from south Yamashiro districts.  Major exhibitions are Kesadasukimon Dōtaku (ritual bronze bell with crossed band design), roofing tile from Imperial Audience Hall of Kuni-kyō, cray face, statue of Gozo Tenno, Standing Statue of Amida Nyorai, white and black face masks.

Special Exhibition

2018 
 Akira Akitsuki, A painter walked with Buddha
 Opening of rail road and modern development of South Yamashiro area
 Excavated history of Kyoto, 2018
 Whispers of letters - Writings on excavated articles
 Tools for daily life - now and then

Activities

Visitor Participation
Children activity "Let's make a Dotaku-shaped Lampshade", "Let's make bronze mirror", "Let's make Wadōkaichin, Bronze Coin".

Seminars
Various seminars on history in the area. Example includes "Walking through history - walking along Daibutsu Tetsudo".

Lectures
Lectures held be museum staffs or invited lecturers on topic of history.

Access
About a 20–25 minute walk from Kamikoma Station of JR Nara Line.

Open hour and date
Open 9:00 - 16:30.

Closed on Monday (except on holidays, in which case it is closed on Tuesday) and at the end and beginning of the year.

References

External links 
 Official Webpage (in Japanese)

Archaeological museums in Japan
Museums in Kyoto Prefecture